Gro Hagemann (born 3 September 1945) is a Norwegian historian.

She was born in Oslo and completed her Doctor of Philosophy degree in 1989 with the thesis Lavtlønnsyrker blir til. Kvinnearbeid og kjønnsskiller i søm og telekommunikasjon 1870–1940. She has been a professor at the University of Oslo since 1992. Hagemann is a member of the Norwegian Academy of Science and Letters and from 1990 to 1993 she chaired the Norwegian Historical Association. She was awarded the Gina Krog Prize in 2009.

Among her most important publications are Skolefolk. Lærernes historie i Norge (1992), Kjønn og industrialisering (1994) and Det moderne gjennombrudd 1870–1905 (1997, volume nine of Aschehougs Norgeshistorie).

References

1945 births
Living people
20th-century Norwegian historians
Academic staff of the University of Oslo
Members of the Norwegian Academy of Science and Letters
Writers from Oslo
Norwegian women academics
Norwegian women writers
Norwegian women historians
21st-century Norwegian historians